Aleppo Township is the name of some places in the U.S. state of Pennsylvania:
Aleppo Township, Allegheny County, Pennsylvania
Aleppo Township, Greene County, Pennsylvania

See also
Aleppo, Pennsylvania, in Greene County

Pennsylvania township disambiguation pages